Malirekus hastatus, the brook springfly, is a species of springfly in the family Perlodidae. It is found in North America.

References

External links

 

Perlodidae
Articles created by Qbugbot
Insects described in 1920